The collared towhee (Pipilo ocai) is a species of bird in the family Passerellidae that is endemic to Mexico. Its natural habitats are subtropical or tropical moist pine-oak montane forest and heavily degraded former forest.

In terms of weight, and standard bill and tarsal measurements, this is the largest species of emberizid overall, although related species, including Abert's, canyon and California towhees, outrank the collared towhee in overall length, as well as tail and wing length. In the collared towhee, the chestnut cap, yellowish green upperparts, black cheek and breast band, gray flanks, and white chin are curiously similar to that of the chestnut-capped brush finch, but note the latter's thinner breast band and more golden (not whitish) supercilium. The towhee's trilling song interspersed with chips is also very different from the brush-finche's very high-pitched hissing song.

References

External links

collared towhee
Birds of Mexico
Endemic birds of Mexico
collared towhee
Taxonomy articles created by Polbot
Birds of the Sierra Madre del Sur
Birds of the Trans-Mexican Volcanic Belt